William McAdam Sharp (1889 – 8 July 1915) was a Scottish professional footballer who played in the Scottish League for Clyde and Johnstone as an inside left.

Personal life 
Prior to the First World War, Sharp was employed as a book-keeper with Harvey's in Saucel, Glasgow. In October 1914, two months after Britain's entry into the First World War, Sharp enlisted as a guardsman in the Scots Guards. He was serving in the 1st Battalion when he was killed in France on 8 July 1915. He was buried in Dud Corner Cemetery, near Loos.

References 

Scottish footballers
1915 deaths
British Army personnel of World War I
British military personnel killed in World War I
1889 births
Scots Guards soldiers
Association football inside forwards
Kilbirnie Ladeside F.C. players
Scottish Football League players
Scottish Junior Football Association players
Clyde F.C. players
St Mirren F.C. players
Johnstone F.C. players
Footballers from Paisley, Renfrewshire
Burials in France
Military personnel from Paisley, Renfrewshire